The 93rd Academy Awards ceremony, presented by the Academy of Motion Picture Arts and Sciences (AMPAS), honored films released from January 1, 2020, to February 28, 2021, at Union Station in Los Angeles. The ceremony was held on April 25, 2021, rather than its usual late-February date due to the COVID-19 pandemic. During the ceremony, the AMPAS presented Academy Awards (commonly referred to as Oscars) in 23 categories. The ceremony, televised in the United States by ABC, was produced by Jesse Collins, Stacey Sher, and Steven Soderbergh, and was directed by Glenn Weiss. For the third consecutive year, the ceremony had no official host. In related events, the Academy Scientific and Technical Awards were presented by host Nia DaCosta on February 13, 2021, in a virtual ceremony.

Nomadland won three awards at the main ceremony, including Best Picture. Other winners included The Father, Judas and the Black Messiah, Ma Rainey's Black Bottom, Mank, Soul and Sound of Metal with two awards each, and Another Round, Colette, If Anything Happens I Love You, Minari, My Octopus Teacher, Promising Young Woman, Tenet, and Two Distant Strangers with one. The telecast received mostly negative reviews, and it garnered 10.4 million viewers, making it the least-watched Oscar broadcast since 1974's ceremony, when Nielsen began keeping records of viewership.

Winners and nominees 

The nominees for the 93rd Academy Awards were announced on March 15, 2021, by actress Priyanka Chopra and singer Nick Jonas during a live global stream originating from London. Mank led all nominees with ten nominations. The winners were announced during the awards ceremony on April 25. Chinese filmmaker Chloé Zhao became the first woman of color to win Best Director and the second woman overall after Kathryn Bigelow, who won at the 2010 ceremony for directing The Hurt Locker. At age 83, Best Actor winner Anthony Hopkins was the oldest performer to ever win a competitive acting Oscar. Best Actress winner Frances McDormand became the seventh person to win a third acting Oscar, the third to win three leading performance Oscars, and the second to win Best Actress three times. As a producer of Nomadland, she also was the first person in history to win Oscars for both acting and producing for the same film. Best Supporting Actress winner Youn Yuh-jung became the first Korean performer and second Asian female to win an acting Oscar after Miyoshi Umeki, who won the same category for her role in 1957's Sayonara. With his nominations in Best Supporting Actor and Best Original Song for One Night in Miami..., Leslie Odom Jr. was the fourth consecutive person to earn acting and songwriting nominations for the same film.

Awards 

Winners are listed first, highlighted in boldface, and indicated with a double dagger (‡).

{| role="presentation" class=wikitable
|-
| style="vertical-align:top; width:50%;"|

 Nomadland – Mollye Asher, Dan Janvey, Frances McDormand, Peter Spears and Chloé Zhao
 The Father – Philippe Carcassonne, Jean-Louis Livi and David Parfitt
 Judas and the Black Messiah – Ryan Coogler, Charles D. King and Shaka King
 Mank – Ceán Chaffin, Eric Roth and Douglas Urbanski
 Minari – Christina Oh, producer
 Promising Young Woman – Ben Browning, Emerald Fennell, Ashley Fox and Josey McNamara
 Sound of Metal – Bert Hamelinck and Sacha Ben Harroche
 The Trial of the Chicago 7 – Stuart Besser and Marc Platt
| style="vertical-align:top; width:50%;"|

 Chloé Zhao – Nomadland
 Thomas Vinterberg – Another Round
 David Fincher – Mank
 Lee Isaac Chung – Minari
 Emerald Fennell – Promising Young Woman
|-
| style="vertical-align:top; width:50%;"|

 Anthony Hopkins – The Father as Anthony
 Riz Ahmed – Sound of Metal as Ruben Stone
 Chadwick Boseman – Ma Rainey's Black Bottom as Levee Green 
 Gary Oldman – Mank as Herman J. Mankiewicz
 Steven Yeun – Minari as Jacob Yi
| style="vertical-align:top; width:50%;"|

 Frances McDormand – Nomadland as Fern
 Viola Davis – Ma Rainey's Black Bottom as Ma Rainey
 Andra Day – The United States vs. Billie Holiday as Billie Holiday
 Vanessa Kirby – Pieces of a Woman as Martha Weiss
 Carey Mulligan – Promising Young Woman as Cassandra "Cassie" Thomas
|-
| style="vertical-align:top; width:50%;"|

 Daniel Kaluuya – Judas and the Black Messiah as Fred Hampton
 Sacha Baron Cohen – The Trial of the Chicago 7 as Abbie Hoffman
 Leslie Odom Jr. – One Night in Miami... as Sam Cooke
 Paul Raci – Sound of Metal as Joe
 Lakeith Stanfield – Judas and the Black Messiah as William "Bill" O'Neal
| style="vertical-align:top; width:50%;"|

 Youn Yuh-jung – Minari as Soon-ja
 Maria Bakalova – Borat Subsequent Moviefilm as Tutar Sagdiyev
 Glenn Close – Hillbilly Elegy as Bonnie "Mamaw" Vance
 Olivia Colman – The Father as Anne
 Amanda Seyfried – Mank as Marion Davies
|-
| style="vertical-align:top; width:50%;"|

 Promising Young Woman – Emerald Fennell
 Judas and the Black Messiah – Screenplay by Will Berson and Shaka King; story by Will Berson, Shaka King, Keith Lucas and Kenny Lucas
 Minari – Lee Isaac Chung
 Sound of Metal – Screenplay by Abraham Marder and Darius Marder; story by Derek Cianfrance and Darius Marder
 The Trial of the Chicago 7 – Aaron Sorkin
| style="vertical-align:top; width:50%;"|

 The Father – Christopher Hampton and Florian Zeller;  Borat Subsequent Moviefilm – Screenplay by Sacha Baron Cohen, Peter Baynham, Jena Friedman, Anthony Hines, Lee Kern, Dan Mazer, Erica Rivinoja and Dan Swimer; story by Sacha Baron Cohen, Anthony Hines, Nina Pedrad and Dan Swimer; 
 Nomadland – Chloé Zhao; 
 One Night in Miami... – Kemp Powers; 
 The White Tiger – Ramin Bahrani; 
|-
| style="vertical-align:top; width:50%;"|

 Soul – Pete Docter and Dana Murray  Onward – Dan Scanlon and Kori Rae
 Over the Moon – Peilin Chou, Glen Keane and Gennie Rin
 A Shaun the Sheep Movie: Farmageddon – Will Becher, Paul Kewley and Richard Phelan
 Wolfwalkers – Tomm Moore, Stéphan Roelants, Ross Stewart and Paul Young
| style="vertical-align:top; width:50%;"|

 Another Round (Denmark) in Danish – directed by Thomas Vinterberg Better Days (Hong Kong) in Mandarin – directed by Derek Tsang
 Collective (Romania) in Romanian – directed by Alexander Nanau
 The Man Who Sold His Skin (Tunisia) in Arabic – directed by Kaouther Ben Hania
 Quo Vadis, Aida? (Bosnia and Herzegovina) in Bosnian – directed by Jasmila Žbanić
|-
| style="vertical-align:top; width:50%;"|

 My Octopus Teacher – Pippa Ehrlich, James Reed and Craig Foster 
 Collective – Alexander Nanau and Bianca Oana
 Crip Camp – Sara Bolder, Jim LeBrecht, and Nicole Newnham
 The Mole Agent – Maite Alberdi and Marcela Santibáñez
 Time – Garrett Bradley, Lauren Domino and Kellen Quinn
| style="vertical-align:top; width:50%;"|

 Colette – Anthony Giacchino and Alice Doyard A Concerto Is a Conversation – Ben Proudfoot and Kris Bowers
 Do Not Split – Anders Hammer and Charlotte Cook
 Hunger Ward – Skye Fitzgerald and Michael Shueuerman
 A Love Song for Latasha – Sophia Nahli Allison and Janice Duncan
|-
| style="vertical-align:top; width:50%;"|

 Two Distant Strangers – Travon Free and Martin Desmond Roe Feeling Through – Doug Roland and Susan Ruzenski
 The Letter Room – Elvira Lind and Sofia Sondervan
 The Present – Ossama Bawardi and Farah Nabulsi
 White Eye – Shira Hochman and Tomer Shushan
| style="vertical-align:top; width:50%;"|

 If Anything Happens I Love You – Michael Govier and Will McCormack Burrow – Michael Capbarat and Madeline Sharafian
 Genius Loci – Adrien Mérigeau and Amaury Ovise
 Opera – Erick Oh
 Yes-People – Arnar Gunnarsson and Gísli Darri Halldórsson
|-
| style="vertical-align:top; width:50%;"|

 Soul – Jon Batiste, Trent Reznor and Atticus Ross Da 5 Bloods – Terence Blanchard
 Mank – Trent Reznor and Atticus Ross
 Minari – Emile Mosseri
 News of the World – James Newton Howard
| style="vertical-align:top; width:50%;"|

 "Fight for You" from Judas and the Black Messiah – Music by Dernst Emile II and H.E.R.; lyrics by H.E.R. and Tiara Thomas "Hear My Voice" from The Trial of the Chicago 7 – Music by Daniel Pemberton; lyrics by Celeste Waite and Daniel Pemberton
 "Husavik" from Eurovision Song Contest: The Story of Fire Saga – Music and Lyrics by Rickard Göransson, Fat Max Gsus, and Savan Kotecha
 "Io sì (Seen)" from The Life Ahead – Music by Diane Warren; lyrics by Laura Pausini and Diane Warren
 "Speak Now" from One Night in Miami... – Music and Lyrics by Sam Ashworth and Leslie Odom Jr.
|-
| style="vertical-align:top; width:50%;"|

 Sound of Metal – Jaime Baksht, Nicolas Becker, Phillip Bladh, Carlos Cortés and Michelle Couttolenc Greyhound – Beau Borders, Michael Minkler, Warren Shaw and David Wyman
 Mank – Ren Klyce, Drew Kunin, Jeremy Molod, Nathan Nance and David Parker
 News of the World – William Miller, John Pritchett, Mike Prestwood Smith and Oliver Tarney
 Soul – Coya Elliott, Ren Klyce and David Parker
| style="vertical-align:top; width:50%;"|

 Mank – Production design: Donald Graham Burt; set decoration: Jan Pascale The Father – Production design: Peter Francis; set decoration: Cathy Featherstone
 Ma Rainey's Black Bottom – Production design: Mark Ricker; set decoration: Karen O'Hara and Diana Stoughton
 News of the World – Production design: David Crank; set decoration: Elizabeth Keenan
 Tenet – Production design: Nathan Crowley; set decoration: Kathy Lucas
|-
| style="vertical-align:top; width:50%;"|

 Mank – Erik Messerschmidt Judas and the Black Messiah – Sean Bobbitt
 News of the World – Dariusz Wolski
 Nomadland – Joshua James Richards
 The Trial of the Chicago 7 – Phedon Papamichael
| style="vertical-align:top; width:50%;"|

 Ma Rainey's Black Bottom – Sergio López-Rivera, Mia Neal and Jamika Wilson Emma – Laura Allen, Marese Langan and Claudia Stolze
 Hillbilly Elegy – Patricia Dehaney, Eryn Krueger Mekash and Matthew W. Mungle
 Mank – Colleen LaBaff, Kimberley Spiteri and Gigi Williams
 Pinocchio – Dalia Colli, Mark Coulier and Francesco Pegoretti
|-
| style="vertical-align:top; width:50%;"|

 Ma Rainey's Black Bottom – Ann Roth Emma – Alexandra Byrne
 Mank – Trish Summerville
 Mulan – Bina Daigeler
 Pinocchio – Massimo Cantini Parrini
| style="vertical-align:top; width:50%;"|

 Sound of Metal – Mikkel E. G. Nielsen The Father – Yorgos Lamprinos
 Nomadland – Chloé Zhao
 Promising Young Woman – Frédéric Thoraval
 The Trial of the Chicago 7 – Alan Baumgarten
|-
| style="vertical-align:top; width:50%;"| 
 Tenet'' – Scott R. Fisher, Andrew Jackson, David Lee and Andrew Lockley
 Love and Monsters – Genevieve Camilleri, Brian Cox, Matt Everitt and Matt Sloan
 The Midnight Sky – Matt Kasmir, Chris Lawrence, Max Solomon and David Watkins
 Mulan – Sean Andrew Faden, Steve Ingram, Anders Langlands and Seth Maury
 The One and Only Ivan – Nick Davis, Greg Fisher, Ben Jones and Santiago Colomo Martínez
| style="vertical-align:top; width:50%;"|
|}

 Jean Hersholt Humanitarian Award 
There were two recipients of the Jean Hersholt Humanitarian Award:

 Tyler Perry – for his active engagement with philanthropy and charitable endeavors in recent years, including efforts to address homelessness and economic difficulties faced by members of the African-American community.
 Motion Picture & Television Fund – for the emotional and financial relief services it offers to members of the entertainment industry.

 Film awards and nominations 

Presenters and performers
The following individuals, listed in order of appearance, presented awards or performed musical numbers.

 Ceremony 

In April 2017, the Academy scheduled the 93rd ceremony for February 28, 2021. However, due to the impacts stemming from the COVID-19 pandemic on both cinema and television, the AMPAS Board of Governors later decided to move the date for the 2021 gala by two months to April 25. The annual Academy Governors Awards and corresponding nominees luncheon were canceled due to COVID-19 safety concerns. This marked the first time since the 60th ceremony held in 1988 that the awards were held in April. It also was the first time since the 53rd ceremony in 1981 that the ceremony was postponed from its original date.

In December 2020, the Academy hired television producer Jesse Collins, film producer Stacey Sher, and Oscar-winning director Steven Soderbergh to oversee production of the telecast. "The upcoming Oscars is the perfect occasion for innovation and for re-envisioning the possibilities for the awards show. This is a dream team who will respond directly to these times. The Academy is excited to work with them to deliver an event that reflects the worldwide love of movies and how they connect us and entertain us when we need them the most," remarked Academy president David Rubin and CEO Dawn Hudson.

The tagline for the ceremony, "Bring Your Movie Love", was intended to reflect "our global appreciation for the power of film to foster connection, to educate, and to inspire us to tell our own stories." In tandem with the theme, the Academy hired seven artists to create custom posters for the event inspired by the question, "What do movies mean to you?" Another aspect of the telecast's production was to produce the ceremony as if it were a film, including promoting the presenters as a "cast", being filmed at the traditional cinematic frame rate of 24 frames per-second as opposed to 30, and using a cinematic aspect ratio rather than the standard 16:9 aspect ratio used by most television programming.

As a result of concerns stemming from the pandemic, AMPAS announced that the main ceremony would be held for the first time at Union Station in Downtown Los Angeles with portions of the festivities taking place at Dolby Theatre in Hollywood. To satisfy health and safety protocols, the Academy limited the number of people attending the gala to primarily nominees and presenters. Attendees were asked to submit travel plans to Oscar organizers prior to arriving in Los Angeles and undergo multiple COVID-19 tests and isolation ten days prior to the event. Guests were also asked to wear face masks whenever the broadcast paused for commercial breaks. In consideration of overseas nominees unable to attend the ceremony, producers set up satellite "hubs" such as at BFI Southbank in London where they could participate in the gala. Additionally, the five Best Original Song nominees were performed in previously recorded segments that were shown during the red carpet pre-show. Four of the songs were performed atop the Dolby Family Terrace of the Academy Museum of Motion Pictures; "Husavik" from Eurovision Song Contest: The Story of Fire Saga was performed on location in the song's namesake town in Iceland.

The Roots musician and The Tonight Show bandleader Questlove served as musical director for the ceremony. He, along with Oscars red carpet pre-show host Ariana DeBose and actor Lin-Manuel Miranda, presented trailers for the upcoming films Summer of Soul (...Or, When the Revolution Could Not Be Televised), West Side Story, and In the Heights, respectively, during the ceremony. Architect David Rockwell served as production designer for the show. In a press conference between the production team and reporters, Rockwell stated that the main lobby inside Union Station would be repurposed as the main setting for the awards presentation while adjacent outdoor areas would serve as patios for attendees to congregate before and after the ceremony. He also cited the Millennium Biltmore Hotel and The Hollywood Roosevelt Hotel, the latter of which was the venue of the inaugural Oscars ceremony, as inspirations for the design and staging of the festivities. Actors Colman Domingo and Andrew Rannells hosted Oscars: After Dark, a program airing immediately after the ceremony interviewing winners and nominees.

The ceremony offered accommodations for those who are deaf or visually impaired; it was the first Academy Awards to be broadcast with audio description for the visually impaired (carried via second audio program on the ABC telecast), which (along with its closed captioning) was sponsored by Google. A sign language interpreter was available in the media room. Contrarily, deaf actress Marlee Matlin served as one of the award presenters, with her long-time partner Jack Jason interpreting her American Sign Language to spoken English.

Eligibility and other rule changes
Due to the ceremony date change, the Academy changed the eligibility deadline for feature films from December 31, 2020, to February 28, 2021. AMPAS president Rubin and CEO Hudson explained the decision to extended the eligibility period saying, "For over a century, movies have played an important role in comforting, inspiring, and entertaining us during the darkest of times. They certainly have this year. Our hope, in extending the eligibility period and our Awards date, is to provide the flexibility filmmakers need to finish and release their films without being penalized for something beyond anyone's control."

The Academy also revised its release and distribution requirements by allowing for films that were released via video on demand or streaming to be eligible for the awards on the condition that said films were originally scheduled to have a theatrical release and were subsequently uploaded to AMPAS's online screening service within 60 days of their public release. AMPAS also amended its theatrical exhibition qualifying rules to allow films debuting in theaters located in New York City, Chicago, the San Francisco Bay Area, Atlanta,  and Miami to qualify for the awards in addition to venues in Los Angeles. Moreover, a week of nightly screenings at a drive-in theater within the aforementioned cities also rendered films eligible for consideration.

Furthermore, the Academy made changes to specific award categories. The Best Sound Mixing and Best Sound Editing categories were combined into a single Best Sound category due to concerns from the Sound branch that the two categories had too much overlap in scope. The rules for Best Original Score were changed to require that a film's score include a minimum of 60% original music, with franchise films and sequels being required to have a minimum of 80% new music. Finally, preliminary voting for Best International Feature Film was also opened to all voting members of the Academy for the first time.

 Best Actor announcement ending 

In a break with tradition, the lead acting categories were presented last after the awarding of Best Picture, with Best Actor coming last. This led many viewers to believe that the ceremony's producers were anticipating Chadwick Boseman posthumously winning Best Actor, which could have been accompanied by a tribute to the actor; Boseman had been considered a strong frontrunner for the award. When presenter Joaquin Phoenix announced that Anthony Hopkins was the winner of the category, Phoenix said that the Academy accepted the award on behalf of the latter, who was not present, and the ceremony came to an abrupt end. It was later reported that Hopkins, who did not want to travel from his home in Wales, offered to appear via Zoom, but the producers declined his request. The day after the ceremony, he released an acceptance speech on Instagram, in which he thanked the Academy, said that he "really did not expect" to win, and paid tribute to Boseman. The selection of Hopkins over Boseman was controversial, with some feeling like it was a setup, though Boseman's brother reported the family did not have any hard feelings toward the Academy.

In a subsequent interview with the Los Angeles Times, Soderbergh said that switching the traditional order of awards was planned before the nominations were announced, claiming "actors' speeches tend to be more dramatic than producers' speeches". He said that the possibility of Boseman's widow accepting the award "would have been such a shattering moment" and "there would be nowhere to go after that". Soderbergh also defended the decision to not allow acceptance speeches via Zoom.

Critical reviews
Many media outlets received the broadcast negatively. Television critic Mike Hale of The New York Times wrote, "Sunday's broadcast on ABC was more like a cross between the Golden Globes and the closing-night banquet of a long, exhausting convention." He also commented, "The trade-off — whether because of the smaller crowd, the social distancing, or the sound quality in the cavernous space — was what felt like a dead room, both acoustically and emotionally. There were powerful and moving speeches, but they didn't seem to be generating much excitement, and when the people in the room aren't excited, it's hard to get excited at home." Rolling Stone columnist Rob Sheffield noted, "The most flamboyantly unplanned and half-assed Oscar Night in recent history was a grind from beginning to end." He also criticized the production of the "In Memoriam" segment saying that the montage was edited at an inappropriately fast pace. Kelly Lawler of USA Today commented, "While it was certainly challenging to stage the show safely, last month's Grammys proved that it is possible to make something entertaining and engaging amid the pandemic. Unfortunately, the Oscars producers seemingly missed that show. The Oscars were a train wreck at the train station, an excruciatingly long, boring telecast that lacked the verve of so many movies we love."

Others gave a more favorable review of the show. Time columnist Judy Berman wrote that the ceremony "was more entertaining than the average pre-COVID Oscars. It started out especially strong." She also added, "Every part of this year's ceremony felt more intimate and less stuffy than just about any awards show I can remember. For once, the art and community of film seemed to take precedence over the business of film." Associated Press reporter Lindsey Bahr commented, "The 93rd Academy Awards wasn't exactly a movie, but it was a show made for people who love learning about movies. And it stubbornly, defiantly wasn't trying to be anything else." Darren Franlch of Entertainment Weekly gave an average review of the telecast, but singled out the winners and presenters for providing memorable moments throughout the show.

Ratings and reception
The American telecast on ABC drew in an average of 10.4 million people over its length, which was a 56% decrease from the previous year's ceremony. The show also earned lower Nielsen ratings compared to the previous ceremony with 5.9% of households watching the ceremony. In addition, it garnered a lower rating among viewers between ages 18–49 with a 2.1 rating among viewers in that demographic. It earned the lowest viewership for an Academy Award telecast since figures were compiled beginning with the 46th ceremony in 1974.

In July 2021, the ceremony presentation received eight nominations for the 73rd Primetime Emmy Awards. Two months later, the ceremony won for Outstanding Production Design for a Variety Special (Alana Billingsley, Joe Celli, Jason Howard, and David Rockwell).

 Censorship in China and Hong Kong
The ceremony was subject to various forms of censorship in China and its territories. Due to scrutiny over Nomadland director Chloé Zhao—a Chinese-American citizen who reportedly made comments critical of China in a 2013 interview with Filmmaker magazine—the ceremony telecast was pulled by its local rightsholders in the mainland, and all discussions of the ceremony were censored from Chinese social media and news outlets.

In addition, Hong Kong broadcaster TVB announced that the ceremony would not be shown live in the region for the first time since 1969. A TVB spokesperson told AFP that this was a "commercial decision". It was speculated that the decision was in retaliation for the nomination of Do Not Split, a documentary on Hong Kong's pro-democracy protests in 2019, for Best Documentary Short Subject.

 "In Memoriam" 
The annual "In Memoriam" segment was presented by Angela Bassett. The montage featured the song "As" by singer Stevie Wonder.

 Cicely Tyson – actress
 Ian Holm – actor
 Max von Sydow – actor
 Cloris Leachman – actress
 Yaphet Kotto – actor
 Joel Schumacher – director
 Bertrand Tavernier – director
 Jean-Claude Carrière – writer, director
 Olivia de Havilland – actress
 Irrfan Khan – actor
 Michael Apted – director, producer
 Paula Kelly – actress
 Christopher Plummer – actor
 Allen Daviau – cinematographer
 George Segal – actor
 Wilford Brimley – actor
 Thomas Jefferson Byrd – actor
 Marge Champion – actress, dancer, choreographer
 Ron Cobb – production designer, concept artist
 Shirley Knight – actress
 José Luis Diaz – sound editor
 Kelly Preston – actress
 Rhonda Fleming – actress
 Kelly Asbury – director, writer, animator
 Fred Willard – actor
 Hal Holbrook – actor
 Kurt Luedtke – writer
 Linda Manz – actress
 Michael Chapman – cinematographer, director
 Martin Cohen – producer
 Kim Ki-duk – director, writer
 Helen McCrory – actress
 Ennio Morricone – composer
 Thomas Pollock – executive
 Carl Reiner – actor, writer, director, producer
 Larry McMurtry – writer
 Lynn Shelton – director
 Earl Cameron – actor
 Alan Parker – director, writer
 Mike Fenton – casting director
 Edward S. Feldman – producer
 Lynn Stalmaster – casting director
 Nanci Ryder – publicist
 Sumner Redstone – executive
 Rémy Julienne – stunt performer
 Stuart Cornfeld – producer
 Ronald L. Schwary – producer
 Jonathan Oppenheim – film editor
 Al Kasha – composer
 Charles Gordon – producer
 Brian Dennehy – actor
 Charles Gregory Ross – hairstylist
 Alberto Grimaldi – producer
 Johnny Mandel – composer
 Brenda Banks – animator
 George Gibbs – special effects
 Haim Shtrum – studio musician
 Lennie Niehaus – composer
 Leslie Pope – set decorator
 Joan Micklin Silver – director, writer
 Roberta Hodes – script supervisor, writer
 Ken Muggleston – set decorator
 Diana Rigg – actress
 Leon Gast – documentarian
 Anthony Powell – costume designer
 Chuck Bail – stunt performer
 Bhanu Athaiya – costume designer
 Colleen Callaghan – hairstylist
 Peter Lamont – production designer
 David Giler – writer, producer
 Norman Newberry – art director
 Zhang Zhao – executive, producer
 Conchata Ferrell – actress
 Alan Robert Murray – sound editor
 Andrew Jack – dialect coach
 Jonas Gwangwa – composer
 Marvin Westmore – makeup artist
 Pembroke Herring – film editor
 Lynda Gurasich – hairstylist
 Michel Piccoli – actor
 William Bernstein – executive
 Cis Corman – casting director, producer
 Michael Wolf Snyder – production sound mixer
 Ja'Net DuBois – actress
 Les Fresholtz – re-recording mixer
 Jerry Stiller – actor
 Earl "DMX" Simmons – songwriter, actor, producer
 Giuseppe Rotunno – cinematographer
 Else Blangsted – music editor
 Ronald Harwood – writer
 Masato Hara – producer
 Robert C. Jones – film editor, writer
 Walter Bernstein – writer, producer
 Sean Connery – actor
 Chadwick Boseman – actor

See also
 List of submissions to the 93rd Academy Awards for Best International Feature Film

Notes

References

External links
Official websites
 
 
 Oscars channel at YouTube (run by the Academy of Motion Picture Arts and Sciences)

News resources
 Oscars 2021 at BBC News
 Oscars 2021 at The Guardian''

Other resources
 

2020 film awards
2021 awards in the United States
2021 film awards
2021 in Los Angeles
Academy Awards ceremonies
April 2021 events in the United States
Events postponed due to the COVID-19 pandemic
A
Impact of the COVID-19 pandemic on television
Television shows directed by Glenn Weiss